Sara González Rodríguez (born 23 May 1989), known as Sara Tui, is a Spanish footballer who plays as a central midfielder for Italian club Napoli.

Club career
Tui started her career at Arousana and then later played at Pontevedra, L'Estartit, El Olivo and Granadilla. Tui joined Madrid CFF in 2019. After two seasons at Madrid CFF, she transferred to Italian club Napoli, which was the first time that Tui had signed for a club outside of Spain. She played in the opening game of the Serie A season, a 3–0 defeat to Inter Milan.

International career
As a junior international Tui played the 2008 U-19 European Championship.

Personal life and beach soccer career
Tui enjoys drawing in her spare time. She also plays beach soccer. She has been called up to the Spain national beach soccer team.

References

External links
 

1989 births
Living people
Women's association football midfielders
Spanish women's footballers
People from O Baixo Miño
Sportspeople from the Province of Pontevedra
Primera División (women) players
UE L'Estartit players
Footballers from Pontevedra
UD Granadilla Tenerife players
Madrid CFF players
S.S.D. Napoli Femminile players
Serie A (women's football) players
Spanish expatriate women's footballers
Expatriate women's footballers in Italy
Spanish beach soccer players
Spain women's youth international footballers